Neubrandenburg Airport  is a public, general aviation airport and former military airbase located  north-east of Neubrandenburg in Trollenhagen, Mecklenburg-Vorpommern, Germany.

From 1949 to 1953 the Soviet 899th Fighter Aviation Regiment was located at the airbase.

See also
 Transport in Germany
 List of airports in Germany

References

External links

 
 
 

Luftstreitkräfte airbases
Neubrand
German airbases